Raymond L. Wallace (April 21, 1918 − November 26, 2002) was an American amateur Bigfoot hoaxer.

Wallace was born in Clarksdale, Missouri. He worked as a logger for much of his life, but also in road construction throughout much of Washington, Oregon and California. He served in the United States Army during World War II as an aircraft gunner. Wallace finally settled in Toledo, Washington in 1961.

Bigfoot 
In August 1958, the Humboldt Times of Eureka, California, was the first to use the term "Bigfoot" in their story about huge footprints found by a worker of Wallace's Humboldt County construction company.

Upon Wallace's death, his son Michael revealed that Wallace was in possession of large, poorly crafted, obviously fake wooden feet. According to Wallace's family, Ray's brother Wilbur Wallace and nephew Mack McKinley used these wooden feet to stamp imprints around northern California as a prank. Ray Wallace also created hair and feces samples which the family left in the woods for Bigfoot researchers to find. He created the hair samples by processing hair from the bison he kept on his wild animal farm near Toledo. However, Chris Murphy notes that Ed Schillinger, "who is the only living witness from the Bluff Creek job" and "who considers himself almost an adopted son of the man [Ray]," strongly disputes the family's allegations.

Cryptozoologist Mark A. Hall was a persistent critic of the authenticity of Crew's 1958 tracks, and of certain other Bluff Creek tracks. Another cryptozoologist, Loren Coleman, has been similarly critical.

Regarding Wallace's claim to have told Roger Patterson where to go to shoot the Patterson film, Jeffrey Meldrum writes, "... but it was clear from later interviews that he possessed little knowledge of the specific area ...."

Death 
Wallace died in a Centralia, Washington nursing home at the age of 84.

See also

Bigfoot in popular culture
Jacko hoax

References

Other reading

External links
 

1918 births
2002 deaths
Bigfoot
Cryptozoologists
People from DeKalb County, Missouri
Hoaxes in the United States
History of Humboldt County, California